= Mohra Ni Luni =

- Town
- Location within Pakistan
- Coordinates: 33.26°N 73.23°E
- Country: Pakistan
- Province: (Islamabad Capital Territory) Islamabad C.T
- Elevation: 523 m (1,716 ft)
- Time zone: UTC+5 (PST)

Mohra Ni Luni is a town in the Islamabad Capital Territory of Pakistan. It is located at 33° 26' 10N 73° 23' 20E with an altitude of 523 metres (1719 feet).
